The 1979 Southeastern 500 was a NASCAR Winston Cup Series racing event that took place on April 1, 1979, at Bristol Motor Speedway in the American community of Bristol, Tennessee. The race was notable as then-rookie driver Dale Earnhardt got the first win of his career, he would later go on to win 76 races and 7 championships.

This race was not televised or recorded in any format, watching it live or listening to it on local radio were the only methods of watching this race.

Summary
Five hundred laps were completed on a paved oval track spanning  in only two hours and fifty-five minutes. Six cautions slowed the race for 44 laps. Twenty-six thousand people attended this live event to see Dale Earnhardt defeat Bobby Allison by a time of three seconds. Jake Elder was Earnhardt's crew chief at that time; his nickname was "Suitcase" because he would help a NASCAR driver achieve glory and then leave him for another driver the following season.

Chevrolet vehicles made up the majority of the 30-car racing grid. Millikan would catch something in his eye and would have to report to hospital; J.D. McDuffie ended up being the substitute driver for him.

The winner of the race would receive a purse of $19,800 ($ when adjusted for inflation). Earnhardt took the lead on lap 474 from Darrell Waltrip and lead until the finish. If he wrecked Waltrip, it must not have been too bad because he still finished on the lead lap.

Ralph Jones (a driver-owner) was the last-place finisher of this race; he was forced to end his participation in the race due to brake issues on lap 31. There were three terminal crashes in the race along with three engine failures, one quitter along with a driver with a water pump issues in his vehicle and a driver with a defective rear end on his vehicle.

Mike Potter's career of sporadic starts in Cup and start-and-parks in Busch began in this race. Elmo Langley would enjoy his last real competitive race at this venue. He'd have a few start and parks after this but this was the last time he really tried to finish a race.

Qualifying

Results
 Dale Earnhardt (No. 2)
 Bobby Allison (No. 15)
 Darrell Waltrip (No. 88)
 Richard Petty (No. 43), 2 laps down
Benny Parsons (No. 27), 3 laps down
 Donnie Allison (No. 1), 5 laps down
 Terry Labonte (No. 44), 10 laps down
 Joe Millikan (No. 72), 14 laps down
 James Hylton (No. 78), 14 laps down
 Ricky Rudd (No. 90), 15 laps down
Richard Childress  (No. 3), 16 laps down
D.K. Ulrich (No. 40), 19 laps down
Buddy Arrington (No. 67), 20 laps down
Roger Hamby (No. 17), 27 laps down
Cecil Gordon (No. 24), 30 laps down
Mike Potter (No. 76), 37 laps down
Dave Marcis (No. 02), 38 laps down
Tommy Gale (No. 64), 40 laps down
Baxter Price (No. 45), 44 laps down
Frank Warren (No. 79), 71 laps down
Harry Gant (No. 47), Dropped out after 385 laps with blown engine
Dick Brooks (No. 85), Dropped out after 366 laps due to a faulty water pump
Ronnie Thomas (No. 25), Crashed out after 335 laps
Cale Yarborough (No. 11), Crashed out after 216 laps
Buddy Baker (No. 28), Crashed out after 211 laps
J.D McDuffie (No. 70), Dropped out after 197 laps with rear end failure
Dick May (No. 19), Dropped out after 141 laps with blown engine
Jimmy Means  (No. 52), Dropped out after 100 laps with blown engine
Bobby Wawak (No. 74) Quit after 33 laps
Ralph Jones (No. 98), had brake failure after 31 laps

Timeline
Section reference:
 Start of race: Buddy Baker had the pole position to begin the event.
 Lap 31: Ralph Jones' brakes became problematic; forcing him out of the event.
 Lap 33: Bobby Wawak chose to quit the race.
 Lap 100: Jimmy Means fell out with engine failure.
 Lap 139: Dale Earnhardt took over the lead from Buddy Baker.
 Lap 141: Donnie Allison took over the lead from Dale Earnhardt; Dick May fell out with engine failure.
 Lap 142: Cale Yarborough took over the lead from Donnie Allison.
 Lap 143: Darrell Waltrip took over the lead from Cale Yarborough.
 Lap 197: J.D. McDuffie lost the rear end of his vehicle, forcing an early exit due to safety concerns.
 Lap 211: Buddy Baker had a terminal crash.
 Lap 213: Bobby Allison took over the lead from Darrell Waltrip.
 Lap 216: Cale Yarborough had a terminal crash.
 Lap 255: Dale Earnhardt took over the lead from Bobby Allison.
 Lap 335: Ronnie Thomas had a terminal crash.
 Lap 366: Dick Brooks had to leave the event due to his vehicle having a faulty water pump.
 Lap 385: Harry Gant fell out with engine failure.
 Lap 389: Darrell Waltrip took over the lead from Dale Earnhardt.
 Lap 474: Dale Earnhardt took over the lead from Darrell Waltrip.
 Finish: Dale Earnhardt was officially declared the winner of the event.

Standings after the race

References

Southeastern 500
Southeastern 500
Dale Earnhardt
NASCAR races at Bristol Motor Speedway